Chopoqlu (also Romanized as Chopoqlū) is a village in Sofalgaran Rural District, Lalejin District, Bahar County, Hamadan Province, Iran. At the 2006 census, its population was 419, in 104 families.

References 

Populated places in Bahar County